Ivona Ćavar (born 19 October 1995 in Split, Croatia) is a leading women's Bosnian karate competitor.

In June 2021, she competed at the World Olympic Qualification Tournament held in Paris, France hoping to qualify for the 2020 Summer Olympics in Tokyo, Japan. In November 2021, she competed in the women's 68 kg event at the 2021 World Karate Championships held in Dubai, United Arab Emirates.

She competed in the women's kumite 68 kg event at the 2022 European Karate Championships held in Gaziantep, Turkey.

Achievements
2016
  World Championships – October, Linz, AUS – kumite -68 kg

2018
  European Championships – May, Novi Sad, SER – kumite -68 kg

Awards
Bosnia and Herzegovina Sportsperson of the Year: 2016

References

External links 
 
 
 

1996 births
Living people
Sportspeople from Split, Croatia
Bosnia and Herzegovina female karateka
Competitors at the 2018 Mediterranean Games
Mediterranean Games competitors for Bosnia and Herzegovina
Competitors at the 2022 Mediterranean Games